Patrick M. "Pat" Gagliardi was a Democratic member of the Michigan House of Representatives from 1983 through 1998. He served as Democratic floor leader from 1989 until he left the House.

Born in December 1950 in Bay City, Gagliardi graduated from Midland High School and pursued a degree in sociology from what was then called Lake Superior State College. While at LSSC, Gagliardi met Mitch Irwin. The two won elections in 1978, Gagliardi to the Chippewa County Board of Commissioners and Irwin to the Michigan Senate.

Following his retirement from the Legislature, Gagliardi became head of the Lake Superior State University Foundation. Governor Jennifer M. Granholm appointed him to the Michigan Liquor Control Commission in 2003, where he served until 2011. His papers were deposited with Northern Michigan University.

References

County commissioners in Michigan
Democratic Party members of the Michigan House of Representatives
1950 births
Living people
Politicians from Bay City, Michigan
Lake Superior State University alumni
20th-century American politicians